Henry Malcolm Rebello (17 November 1928 – 27 August 2013) was an Indian triple jumper. He competed in India's first independent Olympic appearance in 1948 in London. He retired as a Group Captain in 1980 from the Indian Air Force.

Rebello died on 27 August 2013, at age 84, following a lengthy illness.

References

External links
 
Oh, Henry... 
Military record for Henry Rebello

Indian male triple jumpers
Athletes (track and field) at the 1948 Summer Olympics
Sportspeople from Lucknow
Olympic athletes of India
1928 births
2013 deaths